Radite is a trade name for an early plastic, formed of pyroxylin - a partially nitrated cellulose - introduced by the Sheaffer Pen Company in the 1920s when plastics were first used as a material for pen manufacture.

Plastics